Macrocarpa, large-fruited in Latin, may refer to:

 Alsomitra macrocarpa, a tropical climber with wing-like seeds.
 Crataegus × macrocarpa, a hybrid between two species of hawthorn
 Macrocarpa - the common New Zealand and Australian name for the Monterey cypress (Cupressus macrocarpa)
 Macrozanonia macrocarpa, an obsolete classification of Alsomitra macrocarpa.
 Zanonia macrocarpa, an obsolete classification of Alsomitra macrocarpa.